The painted bunting (Passerina ciris) is a species of bird in the cardinal family, Cardinalidae. It is native to North America. The bright plumage of the male only comes in the second year of life; in the first year they can only be distinguished from the female by close inspection.

Taxonomy
The painted bunting was originally described by Carl Linnaeus in his eighteenth-century work Systema Naturae. There are two recognized subspecies of the painted bunting.

 P. c. ciris – (Linnaeus, 1758): nominate, breeds in the southeastern United States
 P. c. pallidior – Mearns, 1911: breeds in south central US and northern Mexico

The painted bunting is also called the Mexican canary, painted finch, pope, or nonpareil.

Description

The male painted bunting is often described as the most beautiful bird in North America and as such has been nicknamed nonpareil, or "without equal". Its colors, dark blue head, green back, red rump, and underparts, make it extremely easy to identify, but it can still be difficult to spot since it often skulks in foliage even when it is singing. The plumage of female and juvenile painted buntings is green and yellow-green, serving as camouflage. Once seen, the adult female is still distinctive, since it is a brighter, truer green than other similar songbirds.

The juveniles have two inserted molts in their first autumn, each yielding plumage like an adult female.  The first starts a few days after fledging, replacing the juvenile plumage with an auxiliary formative plumage; and the second a month or so later giving the formative plumage.

Painted bunting eggs are pale blue-white speckled or spotted with brown. Three to four eggs (or occasionally five) appear from March to July in cup-shaped nests usually built in brush or low trees, usually 3 to 6 feet from the ground but up to 12 feet.

Distribution and habitat
The painted bunting occupies typical habitat for a member of its family. It is found in thickets, woodland edges with riparian thickets, shrubbery and brushy areas. In the east, the species breeds in maritime hammocks and scrub communities. Today, it is often found along roadsides and in suburban areas, and in gardens with dense, shrubby vegetation. The wintering habitat is typically the shrubby edges along the border of tropical forests or densely vegetated savanna.  The breeding range is divided into two geographically separate areas.  These include southern Arizona, southern New Mexico, southern and eastern Texas, Oklahoma, Arkansas, Louisiana, northern Florida, coastal Georgia, the southern coast and inland waterways such as the Santee River of South Carolina and northern Mexico. They winter in South Florida, Cuba, the Bahamas, along both coasts of Mexico and through much of Central America. Occasionally, they may be vagrants further north, including to New York, Pennsylvania, and New Jersey. The bird is also found every few years as far north as New Brunswick, Canada. Genetic analyses showed that the species can be divided into three main groups on their breeding grounds: a western, central and eastern group.

Behavior
Painted buntings are shy, secretive and often difficult to observe with the human eye, though can be fairly approachable where habituated to bird feeders. Males sing in spring from exposed perches to advertise their territories. They also engage in visual displays including flying bouncingly like a butterfly or in an upright display, body-fluff display, bow display and wing-quiver display. These displays are used in agonistic conflicts with other males or in breeding displays for females, with females rarely engaging in displays. Occasionally, males may physically clash with each other and may even kill each other in such conflicts. When their breeding season has concluded, buntings migrate by night over short to medium distances. Western birds (Arizona and northern Mexico) molt in mid-migration, while eastern birds tend to molt before they migrate.

Feeding

Painted buntings often feed by hopping along the ground, cautiously stopping every few moments to look around. They regularly eat seeds of grasses, such as Panicum, of sedges such as Carex, and forbs such as Amaranthus, Oxalis, and Euphorbia. In winter painted bunting eat seeds almost exclusively, but while breeding, and in feeding their nestlings, they mainly seek out small invertebrates, including spiders, snails, and insects such as grasshoppers and caterpillars. Sometimes they visit spider webs opportunistically to pick off insects caught in them.

Breeding
Painted buntings are mostly monogamous and are solitary or in pairs during the breeding season, but sometimes exhibit polygyny. The breeding season begins in late April and lasts through to early August, with activity peaking mid-May through to mid-July. The male arrives about a week before the female and starts to establish a small territory. The nest is typically hidden in low, dense vegetation and is built by the females and woven into the surrounding vegetation for strength. Each brood contains three or four gray-white eggs, often spotted with brown, which are incubated for around 10 days until the altricial young are hatched. The female alone cares for the young. The hatchlings are brooded for approximately 12 to 14 days and then fledge at that time. About 30 days after the first eggs hatch, the female painted bunting usually lays a second brood. Nests are often parasitized by cowbirds. Common predators at the nest of eggs, young, and brooding females are large snakes, including coachwhip snakes, eastern kingsnakes, eastern racers and black rat snakes. The painted bunting can live to over 10 years of age, though most wild buntings probably live barely half that long.

Status
The male painted bunting was once a very popular caged bird, but its capture and holding is currently illegal. Trapping for overseas sale may still occur in Central America. Populations are primarily declining due to habitat being lost to development, especially in coastal swamp thickets and woodland edges in the east and riparian habitats in migration and winter in the Southeastern United States and Mexico. They are protected by the U.S. Migratory Bird Act.

Gallery

References

Further reading

Book

Articles
 Academy Of Natural Sciences Of P. (1999). Painted Bunting: Passerina ciris. Birds of North America. vol 0, no 398. p. 1-23.
 Barber DR & Martin TE. (1997). Influence of alternate host densities on brown-headed Cowbird parasitism rates in black-capped Vireos. Condor. vol 99, no 3. p. 595-604.
 Bochkov AV, Fain A & Skoracki M. (2004). New quill mites of the family Syringophilidae (Acari : Cheyletoidea). Systematic Parasitology. vol 57, no 2. p. 135-150.
 Brennan SP & Schnell GD. (2005). Relationship between bird abundances and landscape characteristics: The influence of scale. Environmental Monitoring & Assessment. vol 105, no 1–3. p. 209-228.
 Conner RN, Dickson JG, Williamson JH & Ortego BN. (2004). Width of forest streamside zones and breeding bird abundance in eastern Texas. Southeastern Naturalist. vol 3, no 4. p. 669-682.
 Durden LA, Oliver JH & Kinsey AA. (2001). Ticks (Acari : Ixodidae) and spirochetes (Spirochaetaceae : Spirochaetales) recovered from birds on a Georgia barrier island. Journal of Medical Entomology. vol 38, no 2. p. 231-236.
 Kilgo JC & Moorman CE. (2003). Patterns of cowbird parasitism in the southern Atlantic coastal plain and piedmont. Wilson Bulletin. vol 115, no 3. p. 277-284.
 Klicka J, Fry AJ, Zink RM & Thompson CW. (2001). A cytochrome-b perspective on Passerina bunting relationships. Auk. vol 118, no 3. p. 611-623.
 Kopachena JG & Crist CJ. (2000). Macro-habitat features associated with painted and Indigo Buntings in northeast Texas. Wilson Bulletin. vol 112, no 1. p. 108-114.
 Kopachena JG & Crist CJ. (2000). Microhabitat features associated with the song perches of Painted and Indigo Buntings (Passeriformes : Cardinalidae) in northeast Texas. Texas Journal of Science. vol 52, no 2. p. 133-144.
 Lanyon SM & Thompson CF. (1984). Visual Displays and Their Context in the Painted Bunting Passerina-Ciris. Wilson Bulletin. vol 96, no 3. p. 396-407.
 Lanyon SM & Thompson CF. (1986). Site Fidelity and Habitat Quality as Determinants of Settlement Pattern in Male Painted Buntings Passerina-Ciris. Condor. vol 88, no 2. p. 206-210.
 Norris DJ & Elder WH. (1982). Distribution and Habitat Characteristics of the Painted Bunting Passerina-Ciris in Missouri USA. Transactions of the Missouri Academy of Science. vol 16, p. 77-84.
 Quay WB. (1985). Cloacal Sperm in Spring Migrants Occurrence and Interpretation. Condor. vol 87, no 2. p. 273-280.
 Spicer GS. (1977). 2 New Nasal Mites of the Genus Ptilonyssus Mesostigmata Rhinonyssidae from Texas USA. Acarologia. vol 18, no 4. p. 594-601.
 Springborn EG & Meyers JM. (2005). Home range and survival of breeding painted buntings on Sapelo Island, Georgia. Wildlife Society Bulletin. vol 33, no 4. p. 1432–1439.
 Taylor WK. (1974). NEW HYBRID BUNTING (PASSERINA-CYANEA X PASSERINA-CIRIS). Auk. vol 91, no 3. p. 485-487.
 Thompson CF & Lanyon SM. (1979). Reverse Mounting in the Painted Bunting Passerina-Ciris. Auk. vol 96, no 2. p. 417-418.
 Thompson CW. (1991). Is the Painted Bunting Actually Two Species? Problems Determining Species Limits between Allopatric Populations. Condor. vol 93, no 4. p. 987-1000.
 Thompson CW. (1991). THE SEQUENCE OF MOLTS AND PLUMAGES IN PAINTED BUNTINGS AND IMPLICATIONS FOR THEORIES OF DELAYED PLUMAGE MATURATION. Condor. vol 93, no 2. p. 209-235.
 Thompson CW. (1992). A KEY FOR AGING AND SEXING PAINTED BUNTINGS. Journal of Field Ornithology. vol 63, no 4. p. 445-454.
 Young BE. (1991). ANNUAL MOLTS AND INTERRUPTION OF THE FALL MIGRATION FOR MOLTING IN LAZULI BUNTINGS. Condor. vol 93, no 2. p. 236-250.

External links

 Painted bunting - Passerina ciris - USGS Patuxent Bird Identification InfoCenter
 Painted bunting species account - Cornell Lab of Ornithology
 
 
 
 
 

painted bunting
Native birds of the Plains-Midwest (United States)
Native birds of the Southeastern United States
Birds of the Rio Grande valleys
Birds of Mexico
Fauna of the Chihuahuan Desert
Birds of the Caribbean
Birds of Central America
painted bunting
painted bunting